Studio Blu (Korean: 스튜디오블루) was an in-house label founded in 2018 by Stone Music Entertainment. The label was integrating with CJ ENM other label in August 2021 as Wake One

History
Studio Blu was founded in 2018, and houses artists such as Heize, Mia, DAVII and Truedy. $ammy joined the company in 2019.

It was announced that 3 years after their disbandment, I.O.I was set to return in December 2019, potentially with all 11 original members, and will be co-managed by Swing Entertainment and Studio Blu. However, the comeback has been virtually canceled due to scheduling conflicts between the members and the ongoing Produce investigations.

Former artists
 I.O.I (2019) (co-managed with Swing Entertainment)
 Lim Na-young (2019)
 Kim Chung-ha (2019)
 Kim Se-jeong (2019)
 Jung Chae-yeon (2019)
 Zhou Jieqiong (2019)
 Kim So-hye (2019)
 Choi Yoo-jung (2019)
 Kang Mi-na (2019)
 Kim Do-yeon (2019)
 Heize (2018–2020)
 DAVII
 Mia
 Truedy
 $ammy

References

External links

Studio Blu on Facebook

Companies based in Seoul
K-pop record labels
South Korean record labels
Talent agencies of South Korea
Entertainment companies established in 2018
Record labels established in 2018